Pijush Bandyopadhyay is a Bangladeshi stage, television and film actor. He is a former managing director of Bangladesh Film Development Corporation (BFDC).  Bandyopadhyay is also the CEO of the privately owned television channel Ekushey Television.

Career
Bandyopadhyay started his acting career through the theatre troupe "Bahubachan". Later, he worked with "Natyachakra". In 1973, he, along with Nasiruddin Yousuff and Selim Al Deen, founded the troupe "Dhaka Theatre".

Bandyopadhyay also directed stage plays including "Meenkanya", "Ekatturer Khudiram" and "Ekatturer Galpo". He acted in films Agami, "Ekatturer Jishu" and others. He played the main character in 'Agami', which was the first parallel movie in Bangladesh, as well as in the first TV serial of Bangladesh titled 'Shokal Shondha'. Some of his most memorable films are 'Bengali Beauty', 'Mrittika Maya', 'Guerilla' and 'Kittonkhola'. He also directed many stage plays including 'Meenkanya', 'Ekatturer Khudiram' and 'Ekatturer Galpo'. In 2007, he published a recitation album titled "Tui Razakar".

Bandyopadhyay was a freedom-fighter at the Bangladesh Liberation War in 1971.

Personal life
Bandyopadhyay is married to actress Jayosree Kar Jaya. He admires the ideologies of Rabindranath Tagore. He completed his bachelor degree from Government Rajendra College, Faridpur and did masters from Mass Communication and Journalism Department, University of Dhaka.

False Allegation
On October 7, 2015, Anti Corruption Commission filed a case against four people, including former FDC managing director Pijush Bandyopadhyay and three others for allegedly embezzling over Tk 3.46 crore from the FDC project by supplying low-quality audio and recording equipment to the corporation. During the investigation of the national anti-corruption agency, Pijush submitted an application to the commission claiming that he, as an artist, worked sincerely to modernise the FDC while he was its managing director during 2012-2014, and was not involved in any corruption. The commission during its investigation did not find Pijush’s involvement in procuring equipments for the FDC and that is why his name was left out of the chargesheet.

Filmography

References

External links

Living people
Bengali Hindus
Bangladeshi Hindus
Bangladeshi male film actors
Bangladeshi male stage actors
Bangladeshi male television actors
Bangladeshi theatre directors
Year of birth missing (living people)
Place of birth missing (living people)